Sounds of Kolachi, also spelled Sounds-of Ko Laa Chi is a Pakistani Ensemble from Karachi. Like an Indian Ocean blast from the seaport megacity it calls home, Sounds of Kolachi, 10-piece super group of vocalists and instrumentalists from Karachi, blurs raga and Western harmony, counterpoint and South Asian melodic lines, all without losing the groove. In this instantly listenable ensemble, South
Asian classical instruments like the sitar and bowed sarangi are on equal footing with electric guitar and rock rhythm section. Guiding the journey, composer, theorist, and singer Ahsan Bari spins outrageous, bluesy, modal riffs, boosted by a quartet of male and female voices.

Discography

Album - Elhaam 
 Chakardar
 Lakh Jatan
 Man Mora
 Allah He Dey Ga
 Aey Ri Sakhi
 Nain Lagay Ray
 Tarana
 Yaar Mileya

Coke Studio 11 
Ilallah (Coke Studio 11) - 2018

Awards and nominations 

|-
! style="background:#bfd7ff" colspan="4"|Lux Style Awards
|-
|rowspan="2"|2018
|rowspan="2"|"Elhaam" – ''Elhaam
|Album of the Year
|
|}

References

External links 
 
 

Year of birth missing (living people)
Living people
Pakistani musical groups